The Swannell Ranges are a mountain range between the Finlay and Nation Rivers and between the Hogem Ranges and the Finlay Ranges of northern British Columbia, Canada. It has an area of 22932 km2 and is a subrange of the Omineca Mountains which in turn form part of the Interior Mountains.  They are named in honour of legendary surveyor/explorer Frank Swannell.

Sub-ranges
Espee Range 
Fishing Range
Germansen Range 
Ingenika Range
Kwanika Range
Kwun Yotasi Range
Lay Range
McConnell Range
Osilinka Ranges
Peak Range
Tenakihi Range
Tucha Range
Wolverine Range
Wrede Range

References

 
Omineca Country